This is a list of electoral divisions and wards in the ceremonial county of Herefordshire in the West Midlands. All changes since the re-organisation of local government following the passing of the Local Government Act 1972 are shown. The number of councillors elected for each electoral division or ward is shown in brackets.

Unitary authority council

Herefordshire
Wards from 1 April 1998 (first election 1 May 1997) to 1 May 2003:

Wards from 1 May 2003 to 7 May 2015:

Wards from 7 May 2015 to present:

Former county council

Hereford and Worcester
Electoral Divisions from 1 April 1974 (first election 12 April 1973) to 2 May 1985:

Electoral Divisions from 2 May 1985 to 1 April 1998 (county abolished):

Former district councils

Hereford
Wards from 1 April 1974 (first election 7 June 1973) to 3 May 1979:

Wards from 3 May 1979 to 1 April 1998 (district abolished):

Leominster
Wards from 1 April 1974 (first election 7 June 1973) to 3 May 1979:

Wards from 3 May 1979 to 1 April 1998 (district abolished):

Malvern Hills
See: List of electoral wards in Worcestershire#Malvern Hills

South Herefordshire
Wards from 1 April 1974 (first election 7 June 1973) to 3 May 1979:

Wards from 3 May 1979 to 2 May 1991:

Wards from 2 May 1991 to 1 April 1998 (district abolished):

Electoral wards by constituency

Hereford and South Herefordshire
Aylestone, Belmont, Central, Golden Valley North, Golden Valley South, Hollington, Kerne Bridge, Llangarron, Penyard, Pontrilas, Ross-on-Wye East, Ross-on-Wye West, St Martins and Hinton, St Nicholas, Stoney Street, Three Elms, Tupsley, Valletts.

North Herefordshire
Backbury, Bircher, Bringsty, Bromyard, Burghill, Holmer and Lyde, Castle, Credenhill, Frome, Golden Cross with Weobley, Hagley, Hampton Court, Hope End, Kington Town, Ledbury, Leominster North, Leominster South, Mortimer, Old Gore, Pembridge and Lyonshall with Titley, Sutton Walls, Upton, Wormsley Ridge.

See also
List of parliamentary constituencies in Herefordshire and Worcestershire

References

Politics of Herefordshire
Herefordshire